Admiral Spiridonov was a Project 1155 Fregat Large Anti-Submarine Ship (BPK), known in the west as an . The ship was named after Emil Spiridonov, a Soviet admiral who died in 1981. Launched in 1984, Admiral Spiridonov served in the Pacific Fleet with the Soviet and Russian Navies successively until being decommissioned in 2001. While in service, the vessel operated in exercises in the Sea of Japan and made good will visits to a number of Soviet allies during the latter part of the Cold War in Africa and Asia.

Design and development
Admiral Spiridonov was the third ship of a class of twelve Project 1155 Fregat (also known as the Udaloy-class). The vessel was designated as a Large Anti-Submarine Ship (BPK), in accordance with its primary mission of countering submarines, and a destroyer by NATO.

Displacement was  standard and  full load. The ship had a complement of 318, consisting of 37 officers, 45 warrant officers and 234 ratings.

Armament
To combat submarines, Admiral Spiridonov mounted two quadruple KT-R-1134A URPK-3 launchers for eight 85R missiles in the Metel Anti-Ship Complex along with two RBU-6000 12-barrel rocket launchers for close in defence. The ship was also equipped with two quadruple  CHTA-53-1155 torpedo tubes for 53-65K, SET-65 torpedoes. A hangar aft accommodated two Kamov Ka-27 helicopters for anti-submarine warfare. Protection from aircraft was provided with eight 3K95 Kinzhal missiles mounted in vertical launchers supplemented by  AK-100 DP guns and four  AK-630 Gatling guns.

Electronic warfare
The vessel is equipped with the MR-760 Fregat-MA (NATO reporting name 'Top Plate') air/surface search, MR-320V Topaz-V ('Strut Pair') air/surface search and MR-212/201-1 Vaygach-U navigation radars along with MR-350 Podkat ('Cross Sword') and K-12-1 ('Hot Flash') fire control radars.  The MGK-355 Polinom sonar complex (combining 'Horse Jaw' bow mounted and 'Horse Tail' variable depth sonars) is complemented by two MG-7 Braslet anti-saboteur sonars and the MG-35 Shtil-2 underwater communication system. Two PK-2M decoy RL are mounted.

Construction and career
Admiral Spiridonov was laid down on 11 April 1982 by Yantar Shipyard of Kaliningrad with shipyard number 113, launched on 28 April 1983 and commissioned on 30 December 1984. The ship was named after Emil Spiridonov, who had commanded the Soviet Pacific Fleet until his death in 1981.

On 1 March 1985, Admiral Spiridonov joined the 183rd Anti-Submarine Warfare Brigade. On 16 June 1986, the vessel joined exercises in the Sea of Japan followed by a visit to Wonsan, North Korea, and then operations in the Indian Ocean and Persian Gulf between 1989 and 1991.

On 20 July 2001, the ship was decommissioned and subsequently scrapped.

Pennant numbers

References

Citations

Bibliography

 
 
 
 
 

1984 ships
Udaloy-class destroyers
Cold War destroyers of the Soviet Union
Ships built in the Soviet Union
Destroyers of the Russian Navy
Ships built at Yantar Shipyard